was a town located in Makabe District, Ibaraki Prefecture, Japan.

As of 2003, the town had an estimated population of 16,814 and a density of 463.96 persons per km². The total area was 36.24 km².

On March 28, 2005, Kyōwa, along with the city of Shimodate, the towns of Akeno and Sekijō (all from Makabe District) was merged to create the city of Chikusei and no longer exists as an independent municipality.

External links
 Official website of Chikusei 

Dissolved municipalities of Ibaraki Prefecture
Chikusei